Olney-Oak Lane, Philadelphia, is a section of Philadelphia that is immediately north of Upper North Philadelphia and south of Cheltenham. It is an area that consists of the now defunct township that was called "Bristol Township, Philadelphia County, Pennsylvania". The section is often included as part of North Philadelphia by city government agencies, though locally it is often referred to as "Uptown," along with the Germantown-Chestnut Hill section.

The section includes the neighborhoods of East Oak Lane and West Oak Lane, Feltonville, Fern Rock, Koreatown, Logan, Ogontz, Cedarbrook and Olney.

Demographics
, the Olney-Oak Lane section of Philadelphia had a population of 168,770, with 76,576 males, 92,195 females and a median age of 33.

Racial demographics:
 Non-Hispanic Black: 94,679 (56.1%)
 Hispanic or Latino of any race: 40,336 (23.9%)
 Non-Hispanic White: 15,526 (9.2%)
 Asian: 12,320 (7.3%)
 Mixed or Other: 5,906 (3.5%)

See also
 Bristol Township, Philadelphia County, Pennsylvania

References

 
Neighborhoods in Philadelphia